Claudio Eloy Fermín Maldonado (born in Barinas, Barinas, March 25, 1950) is a Venezuelan politician. He was deputy minister of youth under Jaime Lusinchi, and subsequently Mayor of Libertador municipality, Caracas (1989–1993) for Acción Democrática, narrowly missing out on re-election to La Causa Radical's Aristóbulo Istúriz. He was the AD candidate in the 1993 presidential election, coming second with 24% of the vote.

He ran as an independent in the 1998 presidential election, but withdrew before election day. In 1999 he was elected to the Constituent Assembly which drafted the new Constitution of Venezuela. He ran in the 2000 presidential election under the banner of Encuentro Nacional, a party he founded, gaining less than 3% of the vote. He participated in the 2004 and 2008 regional elections, running for Mayor of Libertador Municipality.

Fermín founded Soluciones para Venezuela Party, which participated in 2020 Venezuelan parliamentary election in alliance with the Networks Party.

References

1950 births
Living people
People from Barinas (state)
Democratic Action (Venezuela) politicians
Mayors of places in Venezuela
Venezuelan sociologists
Members of the Venezuelan Constituent Assembly of 1999